Derek Slaughter (born 1981) is an American politician who is the mayor of Williamsport, Pennsylvania, the first African-American to hold the position. Prior to mayor Slaughter served as city councilman and taught mathematics at Pennsylvania College of Technology.

Early life 
Slaughter was born and raised in Williamsport, Pennsylvania. He attended Williamsport Area High School where he graduated in 1999. In 2003 Slaughter graduated with a bachelor's degree in Information Science and Technology and a minor in Spanish language. He then attended the University of Maryland, College Park where he obtained a Masters in Education. Slaughter returned to Williamsport where he taught mathematics at Williamsport Area High School and the Pennsylvania College of Technology. He also coached the girls high school basketball from 2007 until 2016. Slaughter continued to teach high school and college courses throughout his campaign for mayor.

Mayor of Williamsport 
In March 2019 Slaughter announced he'd be running for mayor as a Democrat. On November 6, 2019, it was announced Slaughter had won the 2019 election for mayor. On January 6, 2020, Slaughter was officially sworn in and assumed office as the mayor of Williamsport.

Personal life 
Slaughter has one son and two daughters. He also has a wife named Vanessa Slaughter. Derek's mom is Judy Slaughter.

See also 

 List of mayors of Williamsport, Pennsylvania

References

External links 

 Derek Slaughter's campaign website

1981 births
Living people
Mayors of Williamsport, Pennsylvania
Pennsylvania city council members
Pennsylvania Democrats
Pennsylvania State University alumni
University of Maryland, College Park alumni
African-American mayors in Pennsylvania